John Howland Cochrane (born 26 November 1957) is an American economist specializing in financial economics and macroeconomics. Formerly a professor of economics and finance at the University of Chicago, Cochrane serves full-time as the Rose-Marie and Jack Anderson Senior Fellow at the Hoover Institution at Stanford University.

Life and career 
Cochrane was born in Chicago.  He attended the Massachusetts Institute of Technology and graduated in 1979 with a Bachelor of Science in physics. He then did graduate study in economics at the University of California, Berkeley, and received a Ph.D. in 1986. He worked as a junior economist on the Council of Economic Advisers from 1982 to 1983. Cochrane was hired by the University of Chicago economics department in 1986 and moved to the business school in 1993. Prior to joining the Hoover Institution, he was the AQR Capital Management Distinguished Service Professor of Finance at the University of Chicago Booth School of Business.

Cochrane has served as head of the National Bureau of Economic Research asset pricing group, and was the editor of the Journal of Political Economy from 1998 to 2003. He was elected Fellow of the Econometric Society in 2001, served as vice-president of the American Finance Association in 2008, and was elected president of this learned society for the 2010 term.

Main contributions 
The central idea of Cochrane's research is that macroeconomics and finance should be linked, and a comprehensive theory needs to explain both of the following:
 how, given the observed prices and financial returns, households and firms decide on consumption, investment, and financing.
 how, in equilibrium, prices and financial returns are determined by households and firms decisions.

That is a standard general equilibrium logic, but many financial economists do not view it as a priority and prefer to explain prices without an ultimate reference to choices of households and firms. Similarly, many macroeconomists choose not to worry about asset prices.

In this vein, Cochrane's work has been to document some empirical patterns and offer some potential explanations. His 1999 Journal of Political Economy, with John Y. Campbell, develops a representative agent model with nonlinear habits that matches the high and volatile risk premium on stocks, the predictability of stock returns, etc. In several articles (1991 The Journal of Finance, 1996 Journal of Political Economy), he develops and tests a "production-based asset pricing model" based on the q-theory of investment.

In two 1992 articles, Cochrane emphasized some features of asset prices which are difficult to account for, such as the predictability of equity returns, and the longterm equity premium.
His more recent work, with Monika Piazzesi, studies bond markets. In particular, in a number of papers, Cochrane and Piazzesi study the predictability of bond returns. In recent blog posts and comments, Cochrane tends to focus more on inflation, debt, and the financial impacts brought by COVID-19. In a 2021 post called "Inflation, debt, politics, and insurance at Project Syndicate", Cochrane thinks that whether inflation surge is transitory or continuous or not depends on the central banks and government. If the government don't respond to inflation with joint fiscal and monetary stabilization policies, inflation will most likely erupt and the economy will be in the shadow of debt and slow economic growth.

Fiscal Theory on the Price Level
Cochrane's research from the mid-2010's up through to the present day incorporates a 'Fiscal Theory on the Price Level', or the theory that inflation is affected by more factors than simply the supply of money—a consensus that originally formed around the work of monetarist economist Milton Friedman.

Cochrane asserts that as governments and central banks accrue more debt, along with the general public losing confidence in that same government to pay the debt back, inflation is adversely affected. As long as governments incur debt and are able to pay the debt off in a timely manner, then inflation is not majorly realized in the form of consumer price increases across the board felt by consumers.

Other contributions 
Cochrane has interests in diverse fields of economics, including asset markets, financial crisis and regulations, monetary and fiscal policies, and health insurance. Cochrane has worked on the fiscal theory of the price level, on the debate between permanent and temporary shocks in macroeconomic fluctuations, and the cost of near-rational behavior.
Cochrane also developed an online class called "Asset Pricing" that is free and opens to anyone who is interested in learning more about this area. By registering through Canvas, students and faculty who intend to learn more about asset pricing will have the opportunities to take this class and complete relevant quizzes and exams. More information about this course can be found on his personal website (https://www.johnhcochrane.com/asset-pricing).

Asset Pricing 
Cochrane is the author of Asset Pricing, a widely used textbook in graduate courses on asset pricing. According to his own words, the organizing principle of the book is that everything can be traced back to specializations of a single equation: the basic pricing equation. Cochrane received the TIAA-CREF Institute Paul A. Samuelson Award for this book.

Media appearances 
Since 2008, Cochrane has appeared more extensively in the media as he contributed to the debate on the financial crisis. His blog "The Grumpy Economist" contains a series of news, views, and commentaries from a humorous point of view. Paul Krugman criticized repeatedly his viewpoint on his blog  and in a New York Times Magazine article, leading John Cochrane to write a response on his website, which was subsequently published in The Wall Street Journal.

Awards 
 2001, Fellow of the Econometric Society
 2014, Doctor honoris causa in Economics awarded by University of St. Gallen, Switzerland

Personal life 
Cochrane's father was a historian at the University of Chicago. Cochrane is married to Elizabeth Fama, a children's book author and the daughter of noted financial economist Eugene Fama. They have four children and live in Hyde Park.

Cochrane previously was a noted sailplane pilot who flew an ASW 27 with the callsign BB. Cochrane no longer flies an ASW 27, but still uses the callsign BB. He was a member of the US Team at the 2010 World Gliding Championships in Hungary.

References

External links 
 John Cochrane's home page at the University of Chicago
 Publications at the National Bureau of Economic Research
 
 
 The Grumpy Economist John Cochrane's Blog
 
 

Living people
University of Chicago faculty
Fellows of the Econometric Society
20th-century American economists
21st-century American economists
Macroeconomists
American textbook writers
American male non-fiction writers
1957 births
UC Berkeley College of Letters and Science alumni
MIT Department of Physics alumni
Financial economists
Libertarian economists
20th-century American male writers
21st-century American male writers
Presidents of the American Finance Association
Journal of Political Economy editors